Édgar Barrera aka Edge is a Mexican songwriter, producer, and musician based in Miami, Florida. He has won a total of 20 Latin Grammys and 1 Grammy Award including "Producer of The Year" in 2021. He has written and produced songs for artists such as Ariana Grande ("Boyfriend" with Social House); Madonna ("Medellin", "Bitch I'm Loca"); Camila Cabello & Ed Sheeran ("Bam Bam"); Shakira ("Me Gusta" feat Anuel AA, "Clandestino"); Maluma ("Hawai", "11PM", "HP", "ADMV", "Sin Contrato", "Marinero", among others); Manuel Turizo ("La Bachata"); Grupo Frontera ("Bebe Dame" feat Fuerza Regida, "Que Vuelvas" feat Carin Leon); Camilo ("Indigo", "Vida De Rico", "Favorito", "La Mitad", "El Mismo Aire", "Ropa Cara"); Christian Nodal ("Botella Tras Botella" feat GeraMX, "Dime Como Quieres" feat. Angela Aguilar), "No Te Contaron Mal", “Se Me Olvido”, “De Los Besos Que Te Di"); Daddy Yankee ("De Vuelta Pa La Vuelta" feat Marc Anthony); J Balvin ("Niño Soñador"); Jennifer Lopez ("El Anillo"); Marc Anthony ("Parecen Viernes"); Grupo Firme ("Ya Superame", "Cada Quien" feat Maluma); Grupo Frontera ("Bebe Dame" feat Fuerza Regida, "Que Vuelvas" feat Carin Leon); CNCO & Yandel ("Hey DJ"); Sebastián Yatra ("Ya No Tiene Novio" feat Mau y Ricky); Bomba Estéreo ("Internacionales"); Wisin y Yandel ("La Luz"); among others.

At the 13th, 14th, 16th, and 22nd Latin Grammy Awards ceremony, Barrera made headlines for being one of the nominees with the most nominations to this prestigious award four times.

Production discography

Latin Grammy Awards

Grammy Awards 

he was also nominated for Boyfriend by Ariana Grande and Social House in Best Pop/Duo

References

Living people
Record producers from Texas
Songwriters from Texas
Grammy Award winners
Latin Grammy Award winners
Latin music record producers
Year of birth missing (living people)
Latin Grammy Award for Producer of the Year
Latin music songwriters